Hubertus Brandenburg (17 November 1923 – 4 November 2009) was a Catholic bishop of Stockholm. He was ordained priest in Osnabrück on 20 December 1952. On 12 December 1974, he was appointed by Pope Paul VI as auxiliary bishop of Osnabrück. On 21 November 1977, he was appointed as Bishop of Stockholm. He resigned in 1998, and was succeeded by Bishop Anders Arborelius.

Biography 
Brandenburg was born in Osnabrück, Germany, in 1923.  After graduation at the Carolinum High School in Osnabrück, he was drafted into military service. As a Marine soldier, he rose to speed boat commander. Brandenburg studied law and economics after the war. He then moved to the Catholic Theology Faculty of the University of Münster. Ordained a priest in 1952, he was a chaplain in Hamburg Winterhude 1955 to 1958, and completed a PhD in Rome. In 1967 he was appointed a canon, then appointed to the finance director in Osnabruck.

In 1974, Brandenburg was appointed Titular Bishop of Strathernia and auxiliary bishop of Osnabrück by Pope Paul VI. He was consecrated by Bishop Helmut Hermann Wittler on 26 January 1975, co-consecrators were the Curia Bishop and President of the Pontifical Council for Social Communications, Andrzej Maria Deskur, and Auxiliary Bishop of Osnabrück John Albert von Rudloff.

On 13 May 1972 Brandenburg was invested in the Order of the Holy Sepulchre. In 1976, he became a member of the Sovereign Military Order of Malta. 

In 1977 he was appointed bishop of the Diocese of Stockholm. He was a longtime vice chairman of the Nordic Bishops Conference. After his retirement, Brandenburg lived first in Helsingborg, before returning to his home town of Osnabrück.

Since 1946, Brandenburg was a member of the Catholic fraternity KDSt.V. Sauerlandia Munster, a Catholic student fraternity that belongs to the Cartellverband der katholischen deutschen Studentenverbindungen. He was a grandson of member of the German Reichstag Carl Brandenburg, who succeeded Ludwig Windthorst from 1891 to 1902 representing the constituency of Meppen in the Reichstag.

Brandenburg died aged 85 in Osnabrück.

External links
Catholic Hierarchy page

1923 births
2009 deaths
Clergy from Osnabrück
20th-century Roman Catholic bishops in Sweden
German emigrants to Sweden
People from the Province of Hanover
Roman Catholic bishops of Stockholm
20th-century German Roman Catholic bishops
20th-century German Roman Catholic priests
Members of the Order of the Holy Sepulchre